Sthalam Krishnamurth Sravanthi Naidu (born 23 August 1986) is an Indian former cricketer who played as a slow left-arm orthodox bowler. She appeared in one Test match, four One Day Internationals and six Twenty20 Internationals for India between 2005 and 2014. She played domestic cricket for Andhra, Hyderabad and Railways.

She held the record for the best bowling figures on WT20I debut, taking 4/9 against Bangladesh on 9 March 2014, until the record was broken in 2018.

References

External links
 
 

1986 births
Living people
Telugu people
Cricketers from Andhra Pradesh
Indian women cricketers
India women Test cricketers
India women One Day International cricketers
India women Twenty20 International cricketers
Andhra women cricketers
Hyderabad women cricketers
Railways women cricketers